Clivina svenssoni is a species of ground beetle in the subfamily Scaritinae. It was described by Basilewsky in 1946.

References

svenssoni
Beetles described in 1946